Akhun (Axun) is a rural locality (a selo) in Kuzeyevsky Selsoviet, Buzdyaksky District, Bashkortostan, Russia. The population was 387 as of 2010. There are 5 streets.

Geography 
Akhun is located 43 km north of Buzdyak (the district's administrative centre) by road. Kuzeyevo is the nearest rural locality.

References 

Rural localities in Buzdyaksky District